Charleston is an area on the northwest edge of Dundee, Scotland. Menzieshill is to the immediate southwest, Camperdown borders it to the north, and Lochee is to the east.

The area is home to two primary schools - Camperdown Primary (multi-religious) and St Clement's Primary (Catholic) - as well as a library and a variety of small shops. Charleston is a very quiet and small suburb. Thoroughfares include South Road, Dunholm Road, Buttars Loan and Brown Hill Road. There is one play park locally, named Sandy Park.

George Galloway, from 2012 to 2015 the Respect Party Member of Parliament for Bradford West, grew up in Charleston.

Balgarthno Stone Circle

The Balgarthno Stone Circle is a late Neolithic/Bronze Age stone circle in Charleston. It is known locally as the Myrekirk.

Areas of Dundee